The Mount St. Joseph University (The Mount) is a private, Roman Catholic university in Delhi, Ohio. It was founded in 1920 by the Sisters of Charity of Cincinnati.

The university enrolls over 1,800 undergraduate students and approximately 300 graduate students. It offers 48 undergraduate programs, nine associate degrees,  pre-professional and certificate programs, and graduate programs.

History

Mount St. Joseph University was established by the Sisters of Charity of Cincinnati, Ohio, a religious congregation that traces its roots to Elizabeth Ann Seton, North America's first canonized saint. The first Sisters of Charity arrived in Cincinnati from Maryland in 1829 and opened St. Peter's Academy, then St. Mary's Academy. By 1853, these schools were replaced by Mount St. Vincent Academy. In 1906 the academy was named Mount St. Joseph after a move to the Mount St. Joseph property in Cincinnati's Delhi Township, owned by the Sisters of Charity.

Mount St. Joseph Academy offered a four-year high school curriculum but also postgraduate study covering two years of college. In 1920, the Ohio Department of Education granted formal approval for a college curriculum. The College of Mount St. Joseph opened the doors to its first 20 students in September 1920 as the first Catholic college for women in Southwestern Ohio – the same year that American women gained the right to vote.

By the 1950s, the Sisters of Charity made plans to develop property at the intersection of Delhi and Neeb Roads into a new campus that opened in fall of 1962. By the 1970s, adult education brought a new population of women and men to campus for degree studies, and by 1986, the college was coeducational. The Sisters of Charity continued to operate the college until 1972 when the Mount was incorporated under a board of trustees. The institution remains a sponsored ministry of the Sisters of Charity.

On October 9, 2013, the college announced the change to university status. It would be known as Mount St. Joseph University, effective July 1, 2014. The change in designation reflects the institution's expanding academic offerings, including increasing its number of graduate programs for master's and doctorate degrees, as well as implementing online programs.

Athletics

The Mount fields 23 NCAA Division III athletic teams called the Lions, most of which compete in the Heartland Collegiate Athletic Conference.
 
Men's sports: Baseball, basketball, cross country, football, golf, lacrosse, soccer, tennis, track and field, volleyball, wrestling and Esports.
 Two men's sports not sponsored by the HCAC have separate affiliations, both in conferences created for the 2014–15 school year. Lacrosse plays in the Ohio River Lacrosse Conference and volleyball plays in the Midwest Collegiate Volleyball League.
 
Women's sports: Basketball, cheerleading, cross country, dance, golf, lacrosse, soccer, softball, tennis, track and field, volleyball and Esports.
 The HCAC does not sponsor women's lacrosse; that team plays on the women's side of the Ohio River Lacrosse Conference.
 Cheerleading, dance and Esports are university-recognized sports, but are not recognized as official NCAA sports.

Lauren Hill 

In late 2014, incoming freshman basketball player Lauren Hill was suffering from an inoperable brain tumor and facing the possibility of dying before the end of that year, and wished to play in one college game before her death. The Mount's season opener against Hiram College, originally scheduled for November 15, was moved with NCAA approval to November 2; when the event outgrew the MSJ campus, Xavier University gave MSJ free use of its arena, Cintas Center. In a sold-out game that ended up being nationally televised by Fox College Sports, Hill scored the first and last baskets. The game was the start of a charitable fundraising campaign that, by the time of her death in April 2015, raised over $1.5 million for research into the specific cancer from which Hill was suffering. She went on to play in three more games before her declining health forced her to end her playing career. Hill ultimately died of her brain tumor on April 10, 2015. Since her death, MSJ and Xavier have teamed up for an annual season-opening women's basketball doubleheader, the Lauren Hill Tipoff Classic, at Cintas Center.

Student publications
The university's student newspaper, Dateline, is published monthly.

The university's literacy magazine, "Lions-on-line", is published each semester.

The university's student podcast, MountCast, is published weekly.

Greek life
The university has one international fraternity on campus, Delta Tau Delta. Chartered on April 28, 2018, the Kappa Eta chapter initiates male students.

in October 2019, the university announced that Theta Phi Alpha would become the first international sorority on campus for women.

Notable alumni
 Jarrod Martin, member of Ohio House of Representatives
 Lauren Hill, college basketball player and pediatric cancer advocate
 Jesse Minter, college football coach
 Nancy Noel, artist
 Sarah Moormann Scharper, actress, director, teacher, writer and lecturer
 Wes Sims, mixed martial artist (did not graduate)
 Denise Trauth, president of Texas State University
 Christopher Wilke, composer, musician, and teacher

Notable faculty
Nikki Giovanni
Paula González
John Pont
Louis Terhar

References

External links
 
 Official athletics website

 
Association of Catholic Colleges and Universities
Greater Cincinnati Consortium of Colleges and Universities
Universities and colleges in Cincinnati
Educational institutions established in 1920
Catholic universities and colleges in Ohio
Former women's universities and colleges in the United States
Roman Catholic Archdiocese of Cincinnati
1920 establishments in Ohio
History of women in Ohio